Bražciems (also Bražuciems, Bražas) is a residential area and neighbourhood of the city Jūrmala, Latvia.

References 

Neighbourhoods in Jūrmala